George Poffenbarger (November 24, 1861 – March 20, 1951) was a lawyer and long-time justice of the West Virginia Supreme Court of Appeals. He attended Rio Grande College in Rio Grande, Ohio and then taught school for seven years. After studying law under John W. English, a future West Virginia Supreme Court justice, he was admitted to the bar in 1887. After serving as a justice of the peace for two years, he was elected sheriff of Mason County in 1888. In 1900 he was elected to the Supreme Court of Appeals, defeating his mentor John English in the election. He was re-elected in 1912 and resigned in 1922, having served for 21 years.

Poffenbarger married newspaper publisher Livia Nye Simpson in 1894; she died in 1937. They had two sons, Nathan (1898-1962) and Perry (1899-1997).

He died at his home in Charleston on March 20, 1951.

References

Justices of the Supreme Court of Appeals of West Virginia
1861 births
1951 deaths
University of Rio Grande alumni
People from Mason County, West Virginia
West Virginia lawyers
West Virginia sheriffs
American justices of the peace